Alexander Guthrie (1796-1865) was a Scottish merchant and the founder of what is now Guthrie Group Limited. Guthrie was important in the commercial development of Singapore.

References

External links 
https://www.scotweb.co.uk/info/guthrie/

1796 births
1900 deaths
Scottish merchants
Scottish company founders
19th-century Scottish businesspeople